John Roger of Bridport and Bryanston, Dorset, was an English Member of Parliament for Bridport in 1395, 1410 and May 1413 and for Dorset in December 1421. He died later in 1441.

References

14th-century births
1441 deaths
People from Bridport
15th-century English people
14th-century English people